is a Japanese football player as a striker, currently play for Kagoshima United.

Career
Fujimoto attended Kindai University in Osaka for four years: after that, he was signed by SP Kyoto FC.

He scored for three consecutive seasons, but in the end SP Kyoto FC was disbanded in November 2015. As a free agent, Fujimoto signed a new contract with J3 newly promoted side Kagoshima United FC.

On 24 January 2023, Fujimoto announcement return to former club, Kagoshima United for ahead of 2023 season. It will be the first time return to former club in 6 years.

Career statistics

Club
Updated to the start of 2023 season.

Honours

Club
Vissel Kobe
Emperor's Cup: 2019
Japanese Super Cup: 2020

References

External links
Profile at Oita Trinita

1989 births
Living people
Kindai University alumni
Association football people from Osaka Prefecture
Japanese footballers
J1 League players
J2 League players
J3 League players
Japan Football League players
SP Kyoto FC players
Kagoshima United FC players
Oita Trinita players
Vissel Kobe players
Shimizu S-Pulse players
Association football forwards
People from Tondabayashi, Osaka